Borderland is an unincorporated community in Mingo County, West Virginia, United States. Borderland had a post office, which opened on March 6, 1905, and closed on June 20, 2009.

The community may be named on account of its location near the Kentucky border.

Climate
The climate in this area is characterized by hot, humid summers and generally mild to cool winters.  According to the Köppen Climate Classification system, Borderland has a humid subtropical climate, abbreviated "Cfa" on climate maps.

References

Unincorporated communities in Mingo County, West Virginia
Unincorporated communities in West Virginia
Coal towns in West Virginia